The Rare Breed is a 1966 American Western film directed by Andrew V. McLaglen and starring James Stewart, Maureen O'Hara and Brian Keith in Panavision. Loosely based on the life of rancher Col. John William Burgess, the film follows Martha Evans' (O'Hara) quest to fulfill her deceased husband's dream of introducing Hereford cattle to the American West. The film was one of the early major productions to be scored by John Williams, who was billed as "Johnny Williams" in the opening credits.

Plot 
British women Martha Evans (Maureen O'Hara) and her daughter Hilary (Juliet Mills) sail to the United States, in 1884, with Hereford stock, pursuing the dream of Martha's husband, who died accidentally on board, to bring Hereford cattle to the West. They're now left with Hilary's bull, a result of years of European breeding, named Vindicator. Vindicator exhibits all the gentility of breeding, including an odd willingness to follow Hilary merely at the whistle of "God Save the Queen".

At auction, Vindicator results in a bidding war and is ultimately won by Charles Ellsworth (David Brian), who has come to purchase stock for his partner the wealthy Texas rancher Alexander Bowen (Brian Keith). Sam ‘Bulldog’ Burnett (James Stewart), a local wrangler renowned for being able to take down bulls, is hired to transport the bull to Bowen's ranch. Ellsworth has bought the bull primarily to woo Martha, and when she is confronted by him when trying to claim her payment for the bull she decides to ensure Vindicator's delivery by accompanying him en route.

Daughter Hilary tells Martha Evans about a conversation she overheard between Burnett and two men working for competing rancher John Taylor (Alan Caillou). Burnett has made a deal with Taylor to steal the bull. Hilary doesn't yet know that Burnett has made the deal mostly to ensure another wrangler (Ben Johnson) double crossed by Taylor would receive some money to take care of himself after an injury. One of Taylor's men, Deke Simons (Jack Elam), gets into a fight with Burnett in the saloon over terms. Evans, witnessing the brawl, comes to trust Burnett. Despite Burnett's objections, he ultimately accepts responsibility for the Evans women through the train ride to Dodge City and the following wagon trail.

One night while Evans and Burnett have finished brewing coffee over the campfire, a gunshot knocks the coffee pot out of Burnett's hand. Burnett believes this is a signal from Taylor's men. Just before dawn, Hilary catches Burnett saddling up and suspects he is about to hand over the bull. He denies her accusations, waking her mother to prove he was innocent. Once again, Evans gives Burnett the benefit of the doubt.

Taylor's men find a barbed wire fence that has been cut through to make way for Evans' wagon. They conclude that Burnett must have double-crossed them. Simons, determined to catch up with Burnett, shoots his companion and rides on after the wagon.

In a canyon, Burnett runs into Jamie Bowen (Don Galloway), Alexander's son, who has appropriated a herd of his father's longhorn cattle as payment for his work and is running away to start his own ranch. Simons catches up and shoots a cowhand, setting off a stampede. Jamie tries to escape, but falls in the path of the charging cattle and is trampled.

Battered and unconscious, Jamie is carried by Burnett back to the wagon. Simons is there holding Evans and her daughter hostage, demanding the money that Burnett was paid by Taylor for the bull. Simons also demands Evans' money, but while distracted, Burnett is able to take his rifle. Simons mounts and gallops away. Burnett follows. After the horses collide, Simons falls onto a rock and is killed.

Burnett returns with the money, but Martha berates him for his dishonesty and the trouble he has caused. After a few days of traveling with Bowen's son in tow, they reach their destination, his father's ranch.

At the ranch they're introduced to Jamie's father, Bowen, a Scotsman turned cattle rancher at a fort also populated by local families of Mexican heritage. While Hilary nurses Jamie back to health, Martha begins teaching the local children in school. Though Bowen and Burnett insist the Evans women should leave for the East again before they're snowed in, they refuse until Jamie is well and they've taught the men to properly care for Vindicator.

Bowen continues to insist that Hereford cattle can't make it through the tough conditions on the range and thus make them a bad match. Martha and Hilary insist, and slowly, Burnett is coming over to their side. Martha, upon witnessing the wildness of the longhorn cattle, realizes that until Vindicator proves himself, they'll never have the men on their side. Hilary races back to the fort, and releases Vindicator into the wild.

With Vindicator now in the wild to fend for himself and Jamie on the mend, the Evans women announce it is time for them to go, but Jamie insists he's in love with Hilary, who returns the proclamation and Martha, upon seeing them, realizes she needs to stay as well. This suits both Bowen, who's realized he's in love with Martha, and Burnett, who's known he loved Martha since they met.

It is a particularly brutal winter and Burnett insists on finding Vindicator and bringing him back to shelter. Through repeated outings, he can't find the bull and while he's away, Bowen cleans himself up, begins serving tea and showing Martha his gentlemanly side in an attempt to woo her.

Burnett is reported missing and the men finally find him, almost frozen. Bowen insists that he can have any calves that may have resulted from Vindicator, but surely the bull is now dead. Burnett refuses to give up hope, even though Hilary and Martha have come to accept this as truth.

When the spring finally arrives, Burnett begins searching for Vindicator again, hoping for calves and begins building a new kind of farm, where the animals are treated better and Herefords can not only subsist, but thrive. He finally discovers Vindicator, long dead under a snowdrift. He still insists that calves may be coming.

Martha, out of reluctance for anything else, agrees to marry Bowen, but only after there is no chance of calves from Vindicator. In one of the last scenes, Burnett finally finds a cross-Hereford calf, and brings him back to the fort. Bowen and Burnett fight over Martha, and Burnett declares his love for Martha, and Bowen steps aside.

At the end, we're shown an entire field of Herefords, with Martha and Burnett musing that they're glad they kept a "few Longhorn, to remember the way it used to be". Hilary and Jamie approach, now married, and Hilary whistles in the hopes that one of the cattle will respond, and claims, "sometimes, I see a glimmer of him in one of them".

Cast
 James Stewart as Sam Burnett
 Maureen O'Hara as Martha Evans
 Brian Keith as Alexander Bowen
 Juliet Mills as Hilary Price
 Don Galloway as Jamie Bowen
 David Brian as Charles Ellsworth
 Jack Elam as Deke Simons
 Ben Johnson as Jeff Harter
 Harry Carey Jr. as Ed Mabry
 Perry Lopez as Juan
 Larry Domasin as Alberto
 Silvia Marino as Conchita
 Alan Caillou as Taylor
 Gregg Palmer as Rodenbush
 Barbara Werle as Gert
 Joe Ferrante Estaban
 James O'Hara as Sagamon (as Jimmy O'Hara)

Production 
Portions of the film were shot in the Coachella Valley, California. Train scenes were filmed in the Red Hills area near Jamestown in Tuolumne County, California, utilizing the famous Sierra Railway 3 locomotive.

References

External links
 
 
 
 
 

1966 films
1960s Western (genre) comedy films
1966 drama films
1960s historical drama films
American Western (genre) comedy films
American historical drama films
1960s English-language films
Films directed by Andrew McLaglen
Films scored by John Williams
Films set in Texas
Films shot in California
Universal Pictures films
1960s American films